The endothoracic fascia is the layer of loose connective tissue deep to the intercostal spaces and ribs, separating these structures from the underlying pleura. This fascial layer is the outermost membrane of the thoracic cavity.  The endothoracic fascia contains variable amounts of fat.
It becomes more fibrous over the apices of the lungs as the suprapleural membrane. It separates the internal thoracic artery from the parietal pleura.

References

Thorax (human anatomy)
Fascia